Solsidan (lit. "The Sunny Side") is a Swedish television comedy series that premiered on 29 January 2010 on TV4. The series is named after a small part of Saltsjöbaden called Solsidan. It revolves around Alex (Felix Herngren) and Anna (Mia Skäringer) who are expecting their first child and have just moved to Alex's childhood home in Saltsjöbaden, Stockholm County. Alex tries to get Anna to enjoy herself, and at the same time spend time with his childhood friend Fredde (Johan Rheborg). Ten episodes were scheduled to air in the first season. A second ten-episode season premiered 16 January 2011.

Plot and characters
Alex Löfström (Felix Herngren) is a 39-year-old dentist who moves back to his childhood home in posh Saltsjöbaden with his girlfriend Anna Svensson (Mia Skäringer). They are expecting their first child. Anna works as an actress and feels alienated in Alex's home town. She does everything she can to fit in. Alex's mother Margareta (Mona Malm) has sold the house to Alex and Anna, but thinks she is still allowed to drop by whenever she wants. Alex is reunited with his childhood friend Fredrik "Fredde" Schiller (Johan Rheborg), who lives in one of the town's fanciest houses with his wife Mikaela "Mickan" (Josephine Bornebusch) and their two children. Ove Sundberg (Henrik Dorsin) is another one of Alex's childhood friends and is seen as the most annoying person in Saltsjöbaden. He lives with his greedy and pushy wife Anette (Malin Cederbladh).

Production

Solsidan was created by Herngren, Seth Fransson, Kvensler and Edgren  and produced by Jarowskij and FLX, which is owned by Felix Herngren, Niclas Carlsson and Pontus Edgren. The series was directed by Herngren, Jacob Seth-Fransson, and Ulf Kvensler, and written by Herngren, Kvensler, Seth-Franson, and Pontus Edgren. According to Herngren, they had for a long time thought it "would be fun to do a more venturing series where script and characters got a bit more time to develop, and now we got the chance to do that for TV4." Herngren has described Solsidan as a free-standing sequel to his films Vuxna människor and Varannan vecka, and much of the series is inspired by events in his and his friends lives.

Herngren confirmed that he and Rheborg would appear in the series in July 2008. Filming began in the spring of 2009 and finished in June. Much of it was recorded near the sea in the locality of Saltsjöbaden, where the show takes place. In June 2009 Skäringer confirmed that she was playing one of the lead roles. During filming, she commented that "we have so much fun all the time, so we have to struggle to avoid laughing [while recording scenes]." Skäringer has also noted that she had never met Herngren before Solsidan, but that they have "the same tone in [their] acting and work well together." Fredrik Arefalk, TV4's program director, called the series a "modern comedy with sharp humor" and commented that he was "extremely proud and happy" that they had managed to gather some of Sweden's "foremost comedy profiles" for it. It was announced on 3 December 2010 that the script to the series had been sold to the American television network ABC who plans to create their own version of the series in the U.S.

Reception
The first episode of Solsidan, which aired on 29 January 2010, was viewed by 1,840,000 people. It was the fourth highest-watched series in Sweden that week, following Antikrundan, På spåret, and Mästarnas mästare. It was the most-watched series on TV4 and beat Let's Dance, which had 1,675,000 viewers. The second-season premiere aired on 16 January 2011 and was a huge success for TV4. It was viewed by more than 2,500,000 people which makes it, apart from two episodes of Let's Dance and some sports broadcasts, the channel's highest viewing figure of the 2000s.

Seasons

References

External links
Official website at TV4.se

Swedish television shows
Swedish television sitcoms
2010 Swedish television series debuts
TV4 (Sweden) original programming
Television shows set in Stockholm
Swedish-language television shows